Jonče Hristovski (Macedonian: Јонче Христовски; born 1931 in Bitola – 5 April 2000 in Skopje) was a Macedonian singer and composer of folk music. During his career he gained a special reputation among the people as a communicative person and wonderful singer. Among his many successes, his most popular song is Makedonsko Devojče composed in 1964.

Besides his solo career, he has been singing and performing with the CA Tanec and he has been director of one show produced by the national Macedonian Television.

Jonče Hristovski suffered a terrible tragedy when his wife passed after giving birth to their twin daughters, Olgica and Nevenka.

Songs
Among his many songs, most notable are:

Edno ime imame
Živote moj
Aj zasvirete mi čalgii
Zapej pesna makedonska
Makedonsko devojče
Ako umram il zaginam

References

1933 births
2000 deaths
Macedonian composers
Male composers
20th-century Macedonian male singers
People from Bitola
20th-century composers
Yugoslav male singers